A war elephant was an elephant that was trained and guided by humans for combat. The war elephant's main use was to charge the enemy, break their ranks and instill terror and fear. Elephantry is a term for specific military units using elephant-mounted troops.

Description 
War elephants played a critical role in several key battles in antiquity, especially in ancient India. While seeing limited and periodic use in Ancient China, they became a permanent fixture in armies of historical kingdoms in Southeast Asia. During classical antiquity they were also used in ancient Persia and in the Mediterranean world within armies of Macedon, Hellenistic Greek states, the Roman Republic and later Empire, and Carthage in North Africa. In some regions they maintained a firm presence on the battlefield throughout the Middle Ages. However, their use declined with the spread of firearms and other gunpowder weaponry in early modern warfare. After this, war elephants became restricted to non-combat engineering and labour roles, as well as being used for minor ceremonial uses. They continued to be used in combat, however, in some parts of the world, such as in Burma, Thailand, and Vietnam, well into the 19th century.

Taming 

An elephant trainer, rider, or keeper is called a mahout. Mahouts were responsible for capturing and handling elephants. To accomplish this, they utilize metal chains and a specialized hook called an ankus, or 'elephant goad'. According to Chanakya as recorded in the Arthashastra, first the mahout would have to get the elephant used to being led. The elephant would have learned how to raise its legs to help a rider climb on. Then the elephants were taught to run and maneuver around obstacles, and move in formation. These elephants would be fit to learn how to systematically trample and charge enemies.

The first elephant species to be tamed was the Asian elephant, for use in agriculture. Elephant taming – not full domestication, as they are still captured in the wild, rather than being bred in captivity – may have begun in any of three different places. The oldest evidence comes from the Indus Valley civilization, around roughly 2000 BC. Archaeological evidence for the presence of wild elephants in the Yellow River valley in Shang China may suggest that they also used elephants in warfare. The wild elephant populations of Mesopotamia and China declined quickly because of deforestation and human population growth: by 850 BC the Mesopotamian elephants were extinct, and by 500 BC the Chinese elephants were seriously reduced in numbers and limited to areas well south of the Yellow River.

Capturing elephants from the wild remained a difficult task, but a necessary one given the difficulties of breeding in captivity and the long time required for an elephant to reach sufficient maturity to engage in battle. Sixty-year-old war elephants were always prized as being at the most suitable age for battle service and gifts of elephants of this age were seen as particularly generous. Today an elephant is considered in its prime and at the height of its power between the ages of 25 and 40, yet elephants as old as 80 are used in tiger hunts because they are more disciplined and experienced.

It is commonly thought that all war elephants were male because of males' greater aggression, but it is rather because a female elephant in battle will run from a male; therefore only males could be used in war, whereas female elephants were more commonly used for logistics.

Antiquity

Indian subcontinent 

There is uncertainty as to when elephant warfare first started, but it is widely accepted that it began in ancient India. The early Vedic period did not extensively specify the use of elephants in war. However, in the Ramayana, Indra is depicted as riding either Airavata, a mythological elephant, or on the Uchchaihshravas, as his mounts. Elephants were widely utilized in warfare by the later Vedic period by the 6th century BC. The increased conscription of elephants in the military history of India coincides with the expansion of the Vedic Kingdoms into the Indo-Gangetic Plain suggesting its introduction during the intervening period. The practice of riding on elephants in peace and war, royalty or commoner, in the 6th or 5th century BC. This practice is believed to be much older than proper recorded history.

The ancient Indian epics Ramayana and Mahābhārata, dating from 5th–4th century BC, elaborately depict elephant warfare. They are recognized as an essential component of royal and military processions. In ancient India, initially, the army was fourfold (chaturanga), consisting of infantry, cavalry, elephants and chariots. Kings and princes principally ride on chariots, which was considered the most royal, while seldom riding the back of elephants. Although viewed as secondary to chariots by royalty, elephants were the preferred vehicle of warriors, especially the elite ones. While the chariots eventually fell into disuse, the other three arms continued to be valued. Many characters in the epic Mahābhārata were trained in the art. According to the rules of engagement set for the Kurukshetra War two men were to duel utilizing the same weapon and mount including elephants. In the Mahābhārata the akshauhini battle formation consists of a ratio of 1 chariot : 1 elephant : 3 cavalry : 5 infantry soldiers. Many characters in the Mahābhārata were described as skilled in the art of elephant warfare e.g. Duryodhana rides an elephant into battle to bolster the demoralized Kaurava army. Scriptures like the Nikāya and Vinaya Pitaka assign elephants in their proper place in the organization of an army. The Samyutta Nikaya additionally mentions the Gautama Buddha being visited by a 'hatthāroho gāmaṇi'. He is the head of a village community bound together by their profession as mercenary soldiers forming an elephant corp.

Ancient Indian kings certainly valued the elephant in war, some stating that an army without elephants is as despicable as a forest without a lion, a kingdom without a king, or as valor unaided by weapons. The use of elephants further increased with the rise of the Mahajanapadas. King Bimbisara, who began the expansion of the Magadha kingdom, relied heavily on his war elephants. The Mahajanapadas would be conquered by the Nanda Empire under the reign of Mahapadma Nanda. Pliny the Elder and Plutarch also estimated the Nanda Army strength in the east as 200,000 infantry, 80,000 cavalry, 8,000 chariots, and 6,000 war elephants. Alexander the Great would come in contact with the Nanda Empire on the banks of the Beas River and was forced to return due to his army's unwillingness to advance. Even if the numbers and prowess of these elephants were exaggerated by historic accounts, elephants were established firmly as war machines in this period.

Chandragupta Maurya (321–297 BC), formed the Maurya Empire, the largest empire to exist in South Asia. At the height of his power, Chandragupta is said to have wielded a military of 600,000 infantry, 30,000 cavalry, 8,000 chariots and 9,000 war elephants besides followers and attendants.

In the Mauryan Empire, the 30-member war office was made up of six boards. The sixth board looked after the elephants, and were headed by Gajadhyaksha. The gajadhyaksha was the superintendent of elephants and his qualifications. The use of elephants in the Maurya Empire as recorded by Chanakya in the Arthashastra. According to Chanakya; catching, training, and controlling war elephants was one of the most important skills taught by the military academies. He advised Chandragupta to setup forested sanctuaries for the wellness of the elephants. Chanakya explicitly conveyed the importance of these sanctuaries. The Maurya Empire would reach its zenith under the reign of Ashoka, who used elephants extensively during his conquest. During the Kalinga War, Kalinga had a standing army of 60,000 infantry, 1000 cavalry and 700 war elephants. Kalinga was notable for the quality of their war elephants which were prized by its neighbors for being stronger. Later the King Kharavela was to restore an independent Kalinga into a powerful kingdom using war elephants as stated in the Hathigumpha inscription or "Elephant Cave" Inscriptions.

Following Indian accounts foreign rulers would also adopt the use of elephants.
 

The Cholas of Tamil Nadu also had a very strong elephant force. The Chola emperor Rajendra Chola had an armored elephant force, which played a major role in his campaigns.

Sri Lanka made extensive use of elephants and also exported elephants with Pliny the Elder stating that the Sri Lankan elephants, for example, were larger, fiercer and better for war than local elephants. This superiority, as well as the proximity of the supply to seaports, made Sri Lanka's elephants a lucrative trading commodity. Sri Lankan history records indicate elephants were used as mounts for kings leading their men in the battlefield, with individual mounts being recorded in history.  The elephant Kandula was King Dutugamunu's mount and Maha Pambata, 'Big Rock', the mount of King Ellalan during their historic encounter on the battlefield in 200 BC, for example.

Eastern Asia 

Elephants were used for warfare in China by a small handful of southern dynasties. The state of Chu used elephants in 506 BC against Wu by tying torches to their tails and sending them into the ranks of the enemy soldiers, but the attempt failed. In December 554 AD, the Liang dynasty used armoured war elephants, carrying towers, against Western Wei. They were defeated by a volley of arrows. The Southern Han dynasty is the only state in Chinese history to have kept a permanent corps of war elephants. These elephants were able to carry a tower with some ten people on their backs. They were used successfully during the Han invasion of Ma Chu in 948. In 970, the Song dynasty invaded Southern Han and their crossbowmen readily routed the Han elephants on 23 January 971, during the taking of Shao. That was the last time elephants were used in Chinese warfare, although the Wanli Emperor (r. 1572–1620) did keep a herd of elephants capable of carrying a tower and eight men, which he showed to his guests in 1598. These elephants were probably not native to China and were delivered to the Ming dynasty by Southeast Asian countries such as Siam. During the Revolt of the Three Feudatories, the rebels used elephants against the Qing dynasty, but the Qing Bannermen shot them with so many arrows that they "resembled porcupines" and repelled the elephant charge.

Chinese armies faced off against war elephants in Southeast Asia, such as during the Sui–Lâm Ấp war (605), Lý–Song War (1075–1077), Ming–Mong Mao War (1386–1388), and Ming–Hồ War (1406–1407). In 605, the Champa kingdom of Lâm Ấp in what is now southern Vietnam used elephants against the invading army of China's Sui dynasty. The Sui army dug pits and lured the elephants into them and shot them with crossbows, causing the elephants to turn back and trample their own army. In 1075, the Song defeated elephants deployed on the borderlands of Đại Việt during the Lý–Song War. The Song forces used scythed polearms to cut the elephants' trunks, causing them to trample their own troops. During the Mong Mao campaign, the elephants were routed by an assortment of gunpowder projectiles. In the war against the Hồ dynasty, Ming troops covered their horses with lion masks to scare the elephants and shot them with firearms. The elephants all trembled with fear and were wounded by the gun arrows, causing the Viet army to panic.

Achaemenid Persia, Macedonia and Hellenistic Greek states 

From India, military thinking on the use of war elephants spread westwards to the Persian Achaemenid Empire, where they were used in several campaigns. They in turn came to influence the campaigns of Alexander the Great, king of Macedonia in Hellenistic Greece. The first confrontation between Europeans and the Persian war elephants occurred at Alexander's Battle of Gaugamela (331 BC), where the Persians deployed fifteen elephants. These elephants were placed at the centre of the Persian line and made such an impression on Alexander's army that he felt the need to sacrifice to Phobos, the God of Fear, the night before the battle – but according to some sources the elephants ultimately failed to deploy in the final battle owing to their long march the day before. Alexander won resoundingly at Gaugamela, but was deeply impressed by the enemy elephants and took these first fifteen into his own army, adding to their number during his capture of the rest of Persia.

By the time Alexander reached the borders of India five years later, he had a substantial number of elephants under his own command. When it came to defeating Porus, who ruled in what is now Punjab, Pakistan, Alexander found himself facing a considerable force of between 85 and 100 war elephants at the Battle of the Hydaspes. Preferring stealth and mobility to sheer force, Alexander manoeuvered and engaged with just his infantry and cavalry, ultimately defeating Porus' forces, including his elephant corps, albeit at some cost. Porus for his part placed his elephants individually, at long intervals from each other, a short distance in front of his main infantry line, in order to scare off Macedonian cavalry attacks and aid his own infantry in their struggle against the phalanx. The elephants caused many losses with their tusks fitted with iron spikes or by lifting the enemies with their trunks and trampling them.

Arrian described the subsequent fight: "[W]herever the beasts could wheel around, they rushed forth against the ranks of infantry and demolished the phalanx of the Macedonians, dense as it was."

The Macedonians adopted the standard ancient tactic for fighting elephants, loosening their ranks to allow the elephants to pass through and assailing them with javelins as they tried to wheel around; they managed to pierce the unarmoured elephants' legs. The panicked and wounded elephants turned on the Indians themselves; the mahouts were armed with poisoned rods to kill the beasts but were slain by javelins and archers.

Looking further east again, however, Alexander could see that the kings of the Nanda Empire and Gangaridai could deploy between 3,000 and 6,000 war elephants. Such a force was many times larger than the number of elephants employed by the Persians and Greeks, which probably discouraged Alexander's army and effectively halted their advance into India. On his return, Alexander established a force of elephants to guard his palace at Babylon, and created the post of elephantarch to lead his elephant units.

The successful military use of elephants spread further. The successors to Alexander's empire, the Diadochi, used hundreds of Indian elephants in their wars, with the Seleucid Empire being particularly notable for their use of the animals, still being largely brought from India. Indeed, the Seleucid–Mauryan war of 305–303 BC ended with the Seleucids ceding vast eastern territories in exchange for 500 war elephants – a small part of the Mauryan forces, which included up to 9000 elephants by some accounts. The Seleucids put their new elephants to good use at the Battle of Ipsus four years later, where they blocked the return of the victorious Antigonid cavalry, allowing the latter's phalanx to be isolated and defeated.

The first use of war elephants in Europe was made in 318 BC by Polyperchon, one of Alexander's generals, when he besieged Megalopolis in the Peloponnesus during the wars of the Diadochi. He used 60 elephants brought from Asia with their mahouts. A veteran of Alexander's army, named Damis, helped the besieged Megalopolitians to defend themselves against the elephants and eventually Polyperchon was defeated. Those elephants were subsequently taken by Cassander and transported, partly by sea, to other battlefields in Greece. It is assumed that Cassander constructed the first elephant transport sea vessels. Some of the elephants died of starvation in 316 BC in the besieged city of Pydna in Macedonia. Others of Polyperchon's elephants were used in various parts of Greece by Cassander.

Although the use of war elephants in the western Mediterranean is most famously associated with the wars between Carthage and Roman Republic, the introduction of war elephants there was primarily the result of an invasion by Hellenistic era Epirus across the Adriatic Sea. King Pyrrhus of Epirus brought twenty elephants to attack Roman Italy at the battle of Heraclea in 280 BC, leaving some fifty additional animals, on loan from Ptolemaic Pharaoh Ptolemy II, on the mainland. The Romans were unprepared for fighting elephants, and the Epirot forces routed the Romans. The next year, the Epirots again deployed a similar force of elephants, attacking the Romans at the battle of Asculum. This time the Romans came prepared with flammable weapons and anti-elephant devices: these were ox-drawn wagons, equipped with long spikes to wound the elephants, pots of fire to scare them, and accompanying screening troops who would hurl javelins at the elephants to drive them away. A final charge of Epirot elephants won the day again, but this time Pyrrhus had suffered very heavy casualties – a Pyrrhic victory.

The Seleucid king Antiochus V Eupator, whose father and he vied with Ptolemaic Egypt's ruler Ptolemy VI over the control of Syria, invaded Judea in 161 BC with eighty elephants (others say thirty-two), some clad with armored breastplates, in an attempt to subdue the Jews who had sided with Ptolemy. In the ensuing battle, near certain mountainous straights adjacent to Beth Zachariah, Eleazar the Hasmonaean attacked the largest of the elephants, piercing its underside and bringing the elephant down upon himself.

North Africa 

The Ptolemaic Egypt and the Punics began acquiring African elephants for the same purpose, as did Numidia and the Kingdom of Kush. The animal used was the North African elephant (Loxodonta africana pharaohensis) which would become extinct from overexploitation. It is likely that at least some Syrian elephants were traded abroad. The favorite, and perhaps last surviving, elephant of Hannibal's crossing of the Alps was an impressive animal named Surus ("the Syrian"), which may have been of Syrian stock, though the evidence remains ambiguous.

Since the late 1940s, a strand of scholarship has argued that the African forest elephants used by Numidia, the Ptolemies and the military of Carthage did not carry howdahs or turrets in combat, perhaps owing to the physical weakness of the species. Some allusions to turrets in ancient literature are certainly anachronistic or poetic invention, but other references are less easily discounted. There is explicit contemporary testimony that the army of Juba I of Numidia included turreted elephants in 46 BC. This is confirmed by the image of a turreted African elephant used on the coinage of Juba II. This also appears to be the case with Ptolemaic armies: Polybius reports that at the battle of Raphia in 217 BC the elephants of Ptolemy IV carried turrets; these elephants were significantly smaller than the Asian elephants fielded by the Seleucids and so presumably African forest elephants. There is also evidence that Carthaginian war elephants were furnished with turrets and howdahs in certain military contexts.

Farther south, tribes would have had access to the African savanna elephant (Loxodonta africana oxyotis). Although much larger than either the African forest elephant or the Asian elephant, these proved difficult to tame for war purposes and were not used extensively. Asian elephants were traded westwards to the Mediterranean markets with Sri Lankan elephants being particularly preferred for war. 

Perhaps inspired by the victories of Pyrrhus of Epirus, Carthage developed its own use of war elephants and deployed them extensively during the First and Second Punic Wars. The performance of the Carthaginian elephant corps was rather mixed, illustrating the need for proper tactics to take advantage of the elephant's strength and cover its weaknesses. At Adyss in 255 BC, the Carthaginian elephants were ineffective due to the terrain, while at the battle of Panormus in 251 BC the Romans' velites were able to terrify the Carthaginian elephants being used unsupported, which fled from the field. At the battle of Tunis however the charge of the Carthaginian elephants helped to disorder the legions, allowing the Carthaginian phalanx to stand fast and defeat the Romans. During the Second Punic War, Hannibal famously led an army of war elephants across the Alps, although many of them perished in the harsh conditions. The surviving elephants were successfully used in the battle of Trebia, where they panicked the Roman cavalry and Gallic allies. The Romans eventually developed effective anti-elephant tactics, leading to Hannibal's defeat at his final battle of Zama in 202 BC; his elephant charge, unlike the one at the battle of Tunis, was ineffective because the disciplined Roman maniples simply made way for them to pass.

Rome 

Rome brought back many elephants at the end of the Punic Wars, and used them in its campaigns for many years afterwards. The conquest of Greece saw many battles in which the Romans deployed war elephants, including the invasion of Macedonia in 199 BC, the battle of Cynoscephalae 197 BC, the battle of Thermopylae, and the battle of Magnesia in 190 BC, during which Antiochus III's fifty-four elephants took on the Roman force of sixteen. In later years the Romans deployed twenty-two elephants at Pydna in 168 BC. The role of the elephant force at Cynoscephalae was particularly decisive, as their quick charge shattered the unformed Macedonian left wing, allowing the Romans to encircle and destroy the victorious Macedonian right.  A similar event also occurred at Pydna. The Romans' successful use of war elephants against the Macedonians might be considered ironic, given that it was Pyrrhus who first taught them the military potential of elephants.

Elephants also featured throughout the Roman campaign against the Lusitanians and Celtiberians in Hispania. During the Second Celtiberian War, Quintus Fulvius Nobilior was helped by ten elephants sent by king Masinissa of Numidia. He deployed them against the Celtiberian forces of Numantia, but a falling stone hit one of the elephants, which panicked and frightened the rest, turning them against the Roman forces. After the subsequent Celtiberian counterattack, the Romans were forced to withdraw. Later, Quintus Fabius Maximus Servilianus marched against Viriathus with another ten elephants sent by king Micipsa. However, the Lusitanian style of ambushes in narrow terrains ensured his elephants did not play an important factor in the conflict, and Servilianus was eventually defeated by Viriathus in the city of Erisana.

Famously, the Romans used a war elephant in their first invasion of Britain, one ancient writer recording that "Caesar had one large elephant, which was equipped with armor and carried archers and slingers in its tower. When this unknown creature entered the river, the Britons and their horses fled and the Roman army crossed over" – although he may have confused this incident with the use of a similar war elephant in Claudius' final conquest of Britain. At least one elephantine skeleton with flint weapons that has been found in England was initially misidentified as these elephants, but later dating proved it to be a mammoth skeleton from the Stone Age.

In the African campaign of the Roman civil war of 49–45 BC, the army of Metellus Scipio used elephants against Caesar's army at the battle of Thapsus. Scipio trained his elephants before the battle by aligning the elephants in front of slingers that would throw rocks at them, and another line of slingers at the elephants' rear to perform the same, in order to propel the elephants only in one direction, preventing them turning their backs because of frontal attack and charging against his own lines, but the author of De Bello Africano admits of the enormous effort and time required to accomplish this.

By the time of Claudius however, such animals were being used by the Romans in single numbers only – the last significant use of war elephants in the Mediterranean was against the Romans at the battle of Thapsus, 46 BC, where Julius Caesar armed his fifth legion (Alaudae) with axes and commanded his legionaries to strike at the elephant's legs. The legion withstood the charge, and the elephant became its symbol. Thapsus was the last significant use of elephants in the West. The remainder of the elephants seemed to have been thrown into panic by Caesar's archers and slingers.

Parthia and Sassanian Persia 

The Parthian Empire occasionally used war elephants in their battles against the Roman Empire but elephants were of substantial importance in the army of the subsequent Sassanid Empire. The Sasanian war elephants are recorded in engagements against the Romans, such as during Julian's invasion of Persia. Other examples include the Battle of Vartanantz in 451 AD, at which the Sassanid elephants terrified the Armenians, and the Battle of al-Qādisiyyah of 636 AD, in which a unit of thirty-three elephants was used against the invading Arab Muslims, in which battle the war elephants proved to be "double-edged sword".

The Sassanid elephant corps held primacy amongst the Sassanid cavalry forces and was recruited from India. The elephant corps was under a special chief, known as the Zend−hapet, literally meaning "Commander of the Indians", either because the animals came from that country, or because they were managed by natives of Hindustan. The Sassanid elephant corps was never on the same scale as others further east, however, and after the fall of the Sassanid Empire the use of war elephants died out in the region.

Aksumite Empire 

The Kingdom of Aksum in what is now Ethiopia and Eritrea made use of war elephants in 525 AD during the invasion of the Himyarite Kingdom in the Arabian peninsula. The war elephants used by the Aksumite army consisted of African savannah elephants, a significantly larger and more temperamental species of elephant. War elephants were again put to use by an Aksumite army in the year 570 in a military expedition against the Quraysh of Mecca.

Middle Ages 

The Kushan Empire conquered most of Northern India. The empire adopted war elephants when levying troops as they expanded into the Indian subcontinent. The Weilüe describes how the population of Eastern India rode elephants into battle, but currently they provide military service and taxes to the Yuezhi (Kushans). The Hou Hanshu additionally describes the Kushan as acquiring riches including elephants as part of their conquests. The emperor Kanishka assembled a great army from his subject nations, including elephants from India. He planned on attacking the Tarim Kingdoms, and sent a vanguard of Indian troops led by white elephants. However, when crossing the Pamir Mountains the elephants and horses in the vanguard were unwilling to advance. Kanishka is then said to have had a religious revelation and rejected violence.

The Gupta Empire demonstrated extensive use of elephants in war and greatly expanded under the reign of Samudragupta. Local squads which each consisted of one elephant, one chariot, three armed cavalrymen, and five foot soldiers protected Gupta villages from raids and revolts. In times of war, the squads joined together to form a powerful royal army. The Gupta Empire employed 'Mahapilupati', a position as an officer in charge of elephants. Emperors such as Kumaragupta struck coins depicted as elephant riders and lion slayers.

Harsha established hegemony over most of North India. The Harshacharita composed by Bāṇabhaṭṭa describes the army under the rule of Harsha. Much like the Gupta Empire, his military consisted of infantry, cavalry, and elephants. Harsha received war elephants as tribute and presents from vassals. Some elephants were also obtained by forest rangers from the jungles. Elephants were additionally taken from defeated armies. Bana additionally details the diet of the elephants, recording that they each consumed 600 pounds of fodder consisting of trees with mangos and sugarcanes.

The Chola dynasty and the Western Chalukya Empire maintained a large number of war elephants in the 11th and 12th century. The war elephants of the Chola dynasty carried on their backs fighting towers which were filled with soldiers who would shoot arrows at long range. The army of the Pala Empire was noted for its huge elephant corps, with estimates ranging from 5,000 to 50,000.

The Ghaznavids were the first amongst the Islamic dynasties to incorporate war elephants into their tactical theories. They also used a large number of elephants in their battles. The Ghaznavids acquired their elephants as tribute from the Hindu princes and as war plunder. The sources usually list the number of beasts captured, and these frequently ran into hundreds, such as 350 from Qanauj and 185 from Mahaban in 409/1018-19, and 580 from the Raja Ganda in 410/1019-20. Utbi records that the Thanesar expedition of 405/1014-15 was provoked by Mahmad's desire to get some of the special breed of Sri lankan breed of elephants excellent in war 

In 1526, Babur, a descendant of Timur, invaded India and established the Mughal Empire. Babur introduced firearms and artillery into Indian warfare. He destroyed the army of Ibrahim Lodi at the First Battle of Panipat and the army of Rana Sanga in 1527 at the Battle of Khanua. The great Moghul Emperor Akbar (r. 1556–1605 AD) had 32,000 elephants in his stables. Jahangir, (reigned 1605–1627 A.D.) was a great connoisseur of elephants. He increased the number of elephants in service. Jahangir was stated to have 113,000 elephants in captivity: 12,000 in active army service, 1,000 to supply fodder to these animals, and another 100,000 elephants to carry courtiers, officials, attendants and baggage .

King Rajasinghe I laid siege to the Portuguese fort at Colombo, Sri Lanka, in 1558 with an army containing 2,200 elephants, used for logistics and siege work. The Sri Lankans had continued their proud traditions in capturing and training elephants from ancient times. The officer in charge of the royal stables, including the capture of elephants, was called the Gajanayake Nilame, while the post of Kuruve Lekham controlled the Kuruwe or elephant men. The training of war elephants was the duty of the Kuruwe clan who came under their own Muhandiram, a Sri Lankan administrative post.

In Islamic history there is a significant event known as the ‘Am al-Fil ("Year of the Elephant"), approximately equating to 570 AD. At that time Abraha, the Christian ruler of Yemen, marched upon the Ka‘bah in Mecca, intending to demolish it. He had a large army, which included one or more elephants (as many as eight, in some accounts). However, the (single or lead) elephant, whose name was 'Mahmud', is said to have stopped at the boundary around Mecca, and refused to enter – which was taken by both the Meccans and their Yemenite foes as a serious omen. According to Islamic tradition, it was in this year that Muhammad was born.

In the Middle Ages, elephants were seldom used in Europe. Charlemagne took his one elephant, Abul-Abbas, when he went to fight the Danes in 804, and the Crusades gave Holy Roman Emperor Frederick II the opportunity to capture an elephant in the Holy Land, the same animal later being used in the capture of Cremona in 1214, but the use of these individual animals was more symbolic than practical, especially when contrasting food and water consumption of elephants in foreign lands and the harsh conditions of the crusades.

The Mongols faced war-elephants in Khorazm, Burma, Vietnam and India throughout the 13th century. Despite their unsuccessful campaigns in Vietnam and India, the Mongols defeated the war elephants outside Samarkand by using catapults and mangonels, and during the Mongol invasions of Burma in 1277–1287 and 1300–1302 by showering arrows from their famous composite bows. Genghis and Kublai both retained captured elephants as part of their entourage. Another central Asian invader, Timur faced similar challenges a century later. In 1398 Timur's army faced more than one hundred Indian elephants in battle and almost lost because of the fear they caused amongst his troops. Historical accounts  say that the Timurids ultimately won by employing an ingenious strategy: Timur tied flaming straw to the back of his camels before the charge. The smoke made the camels run forward, scaring the elephants, who crushed their own troops in their efforts to retreat. Another account of the campaign by Ahmed ibn Arabshah reports that Timur used oversized caltrops to halt the elephants' charge. Later, the Timurid leader used the captured animals against the Ottoman Empire.

In Southeast Asia, the powerful Khmer Empire had come to regional dominance by the 9th century AD, drawing heavily on the use of war elephants. Uniquely, the Khmer military deployed double cross-bows on the top of their elephants. With the collapse of Khmer power in the 15th century, the successor region powers of Burma (now Myanmar) and Siam (now Thailand) also adopted the widespread use of war elephants. In many battles of the period it was the practice for leaders to fight each other personally on elephants. One famous battle occurred when the Burmese army attacked Siam's Kingdom of Ayutthaya. The war may have been concluded when the Burmese crown prince Mingyi Swa was killed by Siamese King Naresuan in personal combat on elephant in 1593. However, this duel may be apocryphal.

In Thailand, the king or general rode on the elephant's neck and carried ngaw, a long pole with a sabre at the end, plus a metal hook for controlling the elephant. Sitting behind him on a howdah, was a signaller, who signalled by waving of a pair of peacock feathers. Above the signaller was the chatras, consisting of progressively stacked circular canopies, the number signifying the rank of the rider. Finally, behind the signaller on the elephant's back, was the steerer, who steered via a long pole. The steerer may have also carried a short musket and a sword.

In Malaysia, 20 elephants battled the Portuguese during the Capture of Malacca (1511).

The Chinese continued to reject the use of war elephants throughout the period, with the notable exception of the Southern Han during the 10th century AD – the "only nation on Chinese soil ever to maintain a line of elephants as a regular part of its army". This anomaly in Chinese warfare is explained by the geographical proximity and close cultural links of the southern Han to Southeast Asia. The military officer who commanded these elephants was given the title "Legate Digitant and Agitant of the Gigantic Elephants". Each elephant supported a wooden tower that could allegedly hold ten or more men. For a brief time, war elephants played a vital role in Southern Han victories such as the invasion of Chu in 948 AD, but the Southern Han elephant corps were ultimately soundly defeated at Shao in 971 AD, defeated by crossbow shooting from troops of the Song Dynasty. As one academic has put it, "thereafter this exotic introduction into Chinese culture passed out of history, and the tactical habits of the North prevailed". However, as late as the Ming dynasty in as far north as Beijing, there were still records of elephants being used in Chinese warfare, namely in 1449 where a Vietnamese contingent of war elephants helped the Ming Dynasty defend the city from the Mongols.

Modern era 

With the advent of gunpowder warfare in the late 15th century, the balance of advantage for war elephants on the battlefield began to change. While muskets had limited impact on elephants, which could withstand numerous volleys, cannon fire was a different matter entirelyan animal could easily be knocked down by a single shot. With elephants still being used to carry commanders on the battlefield, they became even more tempting targets for enemy artillery.

Nonetheless, in south-east Asia the use of elephants on the battlefield continued up until the end of the 19th century. One of the major difficulties in the region was terrain, and elephants could cross difficult terrain in many cases more easily than horse cavalry. Burmese forces used war elephants against the Chinese in the Sino-Burmese War where they routed the Chinese cavalry. The Burmese used them again during the Battle of Danubyu during the First Anglo-Burmese War, where the elephants were easily repulsed by Congreve rockets deployed by British forces. The Siamese Army continued utilising war elephants armed with jingals up until the Franco-Siamese War of 1893, while the Vietnamese used them in battle as late as 1885, during the Sino-French War. During the mid to late 19th century, British forces in India possessed specialised elephant batteries to haul large siege artillery pieces over ground unsuitable for oxen.

Into the 20th century, military elephants were used for non-combat purposes in the Second World War, particularly because the animals could perform tasks in regions that were problematic for motor vehicles. Sir William Slim, commander of the XIVth Army wrote about elephants in his introduction to Elephant Bill: "They built hundreds of bridges for us, they helped to build and launch more ships for us than Helen ever did for Greece. Without them our retreat from Burma would have been even more arduous and our advance to its liberation slower and more difficult." Military elephants were used as late as the Vietnam War.

Elephants were as of 2017 being used by the Kachin Independence Army for an auxiliary role.

Elephants are now more valuable to many armies in failing states for their ivory than as transport, and many thousands of elephants have died during civil conflicts due to poaching. They are classed as a pack animal in a U.S. Special Forces field manual issued as recently as 2004, but their use by U.S. personnel is discouraged because elephants are endangered.

Tactical use 

There were many military purposes for which elephants could be used. In battle, war elephants were usually deployed in the centre of the line, where they could be useful to prevent a charge or to conduct one of their own. Their sheer size and their terrifying appearance made them valued heavy cavalry. Off the battlefield they could carry heavy materiel, and with a top speed of approximately  provided a useful means of transport, before mechanized vehicles rendered them mostly obsolete.

In addition to charging, elephants could provide a safe and stable platform for archers to shoot arrows in the middle of the battlefield, from which more targets could be seen and engaged. The driver, called a mahout, was responsible for controlling the animal, who often also carried weapons himself, like a chisel-blade and a hammer (to kill his own mount in an emergency). Elephants were sometimes further enhanced with their own weaponry and armour as well. In India and Sri Lanka, heavy iron chains with steel balls at the end were tied to their trunks, which the animals were trained to swirl menacingly and with great skill. Numerous cultures designed specialized equipment for elephants, like tusk swords and a protective tower on their backs, called howdahs. The late sixteenth century saw the introduction of culverins, jingals and rockets against elephants, innovations that would ultimately drive these animals out of active service on the battlefield.

Besides the dawn of more efficient means of transportation and weaponry, war elephants also had clear tactical weaknesses that lead to their eventual retirement. After sustaining painful wounds, or when their driver was killed, elephants had the tendency to panic, often causing them to run amok indiscriminately, making casualties on either side. Experienced Roman infantrymen often tried to sever their trunks, causing instant distress, and possibly leading the elephant to flee back into its own lines. Fast skirmishers armed with javelins were also used by the Romans to drive them away, as well as flaming objects or a stout line of long spears, such as Triarii. Another method for disrupting elephant units in classical antiquity was the deployment of war pigs. Ancient writers believed that elephants could be "scared by the smallest squeal of a pig". Some warlords, however, interpreted this expression literally. At the siege of Megara during the Diadochi wars, for example, the Megarians reportedly poured oil on a herd of pigs, set them alight, and drove them towards the enemy's massed war elephants, which subsequently bolted in terror.

The value of war elephants in battle remains a contested issue. In the 19th century, it was fashionable to contrast the western, Roman focus on infantry and discipline with the eastern, exotic use of war elephants that relied merely on fear to defeat their enemy. One writer commented that war elephants "have been found to be skittish and easily alarmed by unfamiliar sounds and for this reason they were found prone to break ranks and flee". Nonetheless, the continued use of war elephants for several thousand years attests to their enduring value to the historical battlefield commander.

Cultural legacy 

The use of war elephants over the centuries has left a deep cultural legacy in many countries. Many traditional war games incorporate war elephants. There is piece in Chess called Elephant  . While Englishmen call that piece bishop, it is called Gajam in Sanskrit. In Malayalam, it is called Aana (ആന), meaning elephant. In Russian, too, it is an elephant (Слон). In Bengali, the bishop is called hati, Bengali for "elephant". It is called an elephant in Chinese chess. In Arabic – and derived from it, in Spanish – the bishop piece is called al-fil, Arabic for "elephant".

In the Japanese game shogi, there used to be a piece known as the "Drunken Elephant"; it was, however, dropped by order of the Emperor Go-Nara and no longer appears in the version played in today's Japan.

Elephant armour, originally designed for use in war, is today usually only seen in museums. One particularly fine set of Indian elephant armour is preserved at the Leeds Royal Armouries Museum, while Indian museums across the sub-continent display other fine pieces. The architecture of India also shows the deep impact of elephant warfare over the years. War elephants adorn many military gateways, such as those at Lohagarh Fort for example, while some spiked, anti-elephant gates still remain, for example at Kumbhalgarh fort. Across India, older gateways are invariably much higher than their European equivalents, in order to allow elephants with howdahs to pass through underneath.

War elephants also remain a popular artistic trope, either in the Orientalist painting tradition of the 19th century, or in literature following Tolkien, who popularised a fantastic rendition of war elephants in the form of 'oliphaunts' or mûmakil.

In popular culture 
Hathi from The Jungle Book by Rudyard Kipling is a former Indian war elephant who pulled heavy artillery for the British Indian Army. Kala-Nag from Toomai of the Elephants performed similar duties during the First Anglo-Afghan War.

Numerous strategy video games feature elephants as special units, usually available only to specific factions or requiring special resources. These include Age of Empires, Celtic Kings: The Punic Wars, the Civilization series, the Total War series, Imperator: Rome, and Crusader Kings III.

In the 2004 film Alexander scene of the Battle of Hydaspes depicts war elephants fighting against the Macedonian phalanx.

In the 2017 video game Assassin's Creed Origins, they are distributed around the map as boss fights.

In The Lord of the Rings: The Return of the King, Mûmakil (or Oliphaunts) are fictional giant elephant-like creatures used by the Witch-King, Sauron, and his Haradrim and the Orc army to fight against Theoden, Aragorn, Gandalf, Gimli, Legolas, the Hobbits, Merry and Pippin and his Rohan and the King and his Army of the Dead in the Battle of the Pelennor Fields and Minas Tirith.

In Genndy Tartakovsky's Primal, the episode features war elephants fighting against Egyptians.

See also 
 Cavalry tactics
 Cultural depictions of elephants
 Execution by elephant
 History of elephants in Europe
 List of battles involving war elephants
 List of historical elephants
 Sassanid army
 Thai elephant

Notes

References 
 .
 
 
 
  (trans).
 

 
 
 
 
 
 
 

 
 
 .
 
 
 
 
 .

External links 

 Elephants in Sri Lankan History and Culture
 Audio interview with John Kistler on war elephants
 Elephant mystery at ancient Syrian battle solved
 25 Things You Might Not Know About Elephants

Elephants
5th-millennium BC introductions
Elephants in culture
Ancient warfare
Military animals
Animal armour
History of South Asia
Military history of Africa
Combat occupations